Dim (Russian and ) is a rural locality (a selo) in Karmyshevsky Selsoviet, Alsheyevsky District, Bashkortostan, Russia. The population was 278 as of 2010. There are 3 streets.

Geography 
Dim is located 14 km south of Rayevsky (the district's administrative centre) by road. Avryuztamak is the nearest rural locality.

References 

Rural localities in Alsheyevsky District